Slavnica is a village and municipality in Ilava District in the Trenčín Region of north-western Slovakia.

History
In historical records the village was first mentioned in 1379.

Geography
The municipality lies at an altitude of 236 metres and covers an area of 7.810 km². It has a population of about 820 people.

References

External links

 Official page
http://www.statistics.sk/mosmis/eng/run.html

Villages and municipalities in Ilava District